Luis Delgado (born 16 July 1956 in Madrid) is a Spanish instrumentalist, composer, and producer. Delgado's work combines organic elements from Arab-Andalusian music, oriental and Medieval styles with electronic elements from the avant-garde. 

He formed the electronic and industrial musical duo Mecánica Popular, with Eugenio Muñoz in 1978, the group Finis Africae with Javier Bergia and Juan Alberto Arteche in the mid-80's, and the folk group Babia with Arteche and Luis Paniagua.

Delgado's later work includes El sueño de Al-Zaqqaq (The Dream of Al-Zaqqaq) (1998), which sets to music a collection of poems by Ibn al-Zaqqaq.

External links
 11.09.19 interview on NTS radio

References

Singers from Madrid
Spanish male singers
1956 births
Living people